Mandaeans in the United States refers to people born in or residing in the United States of Mandaean origin, or those considered to be ethnic Mandaeans.

Immigration
Mandaean immigration to the United States has been occurring for decades. Surges in Mandaean immigration happened following the Iran–Iraq War, Gulf War, and 2006 bombing of the al-Aksari Mosque.

The Iraq War destabilized the country, causing Mandeans to be targeted by Islamic extremists. In 2007, The New York Times ran an op-ed piece in which Swarthmore College professor Nathaniel Deutsch called for the George W. Bush administration to take immediate action to preserve the Mandaean community and culture. The same year, Iraqi Mandaeans were given refugee status by the US State Department. Since then, more than 2,500 have entered the US. The community in Worcester is believed to be the largest in the United States and the second largest community outside the Middle East. About 2,600 Mandaeans from Iran have been settled in Texas since the Iraq War.

Communities
In the United States, there are Mandaean communities centered on:
San Diego, California
Twin Falls, Idaho
Worcester, Massachusetts (c. 2,500, believed to be the largest Mandaean community in the US)
Metro Detroit, Michigan
New York City
Austin, Texas
Amarillo, Texas
Houston, Texas
San Antonio, Texas (c. 2,500)

Notable people
Suhaib Nashi, of the Mandaean Society of America in New Jersey
Lamia Abbas Amara (1929–2021), Iraqi-born poet who lived in San Diego

See also
Iranian Americans
Iraqi Americans
Assyrian Americans
Kurdish Americans
Mandaean Australians
Mandaeans in Sweden

References

Mandaeans
Middle Eastern American
Ethnic groups in the United States